Katrin Mueller-Rottgardt (born 15 January 1982) is a German para-track and field athlete. She is a T12/F12 classification athlete meaning that she has limited vision and she runs with the aid of a sighted guide. She competed at the 2016 Summer Paralympics in the 100 metres, 200 metres and long jump. She bronze medalled in the 100 metres with a personal best of 11.99 seconds. She runs with Noel Philippe Fiener.

See also 
 Germany at the 2016 Summer Paralympics

References

External links 
 
 

1982 births
Living people
German female sprinters
German female long jumpers
Paralympic sprinters
Paralympic long jumpers
Paralympic athletes of Germany
Paralympic bronze medalists for Germany
Paralympic medalists in athletics (track and field)
Athletes (track and field) at the 2004 Summer Paralympics
Athletes (track and field) at the 2008 Summer Paralympics
Athletes (track and field) at the 2016 Summer Paralympics
Athletes (track and field) at the 2020 Summer Paralympics
Medalists at the 2016 Summer Paralympics
Visually impaired sprinters
Visually impaired long jumpers
Sportspeople from Duisburg